Chapra Government College, established in 2015, is the government general degree college in Chapra, Nadia district. It offers undergraduate courses in science and arts. It is affiliated to University of Kalyani.

Departments

Science

Physics
Chemistry
Mathematics

Arts 

Bengali
English
History
Political Science
Sociology

See also

References

External links

University of Kalyani
University Grants Commission
National Assessment and Accreditation Council

Universities and colleges in Nadia district
Colleges affiliated to University of Kalyani
Educational institutions established in 2015
2015 establishments in West Bengal
Government colleges in West Bengal